Niger competed in the Olympic Games for the first time at the 1964 Summer Olympics in Tokyo, Japan.

Boxing
Men

References
Official Olympic Reports

Nations at the 1964 Summer Olympics
1964
1964 in Niger